Nenad Zivkovic (born 19 March 2002) is a Swiss footballer who plays as a forward for Luzern U21 in the Swiss 1. Liga.

Club career
Zivkovic made his professional debut with Luzern in a 2–1 Swiss Super League win over FC Zürich on 31 July 2020.

References

External links
 
 SFL Profile
 SFV U16 Profile
 SFV U18 Profile

2002 births
People from Cham, Switzerland
Sportspeople from the canton of Zug
Swiss people of Serbian descent
Living people
Swiss men's footballers
Switzerland youth international footballers
Association football forwards
FC Luzern players
Swiss Super League players
Swiss 1. Liga (football) players